Emperor Hui may refer to:
 Emperor Hui of Han (210 BC–188 BC)
 Emperor Hui of Jin (259–307)
 Emperor Hui of Ming (Jianwen Emperor, 1377-1402)

It is also Chinese rendering for the titles of the rulers of Vietnam:
 Lê Kính Tông (1588-1619)
 Dục Đức (1852-1883)

See also
Huizong (disambiguation)